Antonio Porchia (November 13, 1885 – November 9, 1968) was an Argentinian poet. 

Porchia was born in Conflenti, Italy, but, after the death of his father in 1900, moved to Argentina. 

Porchia wrote a Spanish book entitled Voces ("Voices"), a book of aphorisms. It has since been translated into Italian and into English (by W.S. Merwin, Copper Canyon Press, 2003), French, and German. 

A very influential, yet extremely succinct writer, Porchia has been a cult author for a number of renowned figures of contemporary literature and thought such as André Breton, Jorge Luis Borges, Don Paterson, Roberto Juarroz and Henry Miller, amongst others. Some critics have paralleled his work to Japanese haiku and found many similarities with a number of Zen schools of thought.

Works 

 Voces (1943), English translation by W. S. Merwin: Voices, Copper Canyon Press, 2003,

References

External links

Antonio Porchia's Voces Website
The Extraordinary Story of Antonio Porchia An essay of Prof. Vincenzo Villella

1880s births
1968 deaths
Aphorists
Italian male poets
20th-century Argentine poets
20th-century Italian male writers
Argentine male poets
Italian emigrants to Argentina
Naturalized citizens of Argentina
20th-century Italian poets